Byron Paul Brown (8 July 1866 – 21 August 1947) was a New Zealand storekeeper, businessman, community leader, broadcaster, entrepreneur and philanthropist. He was born in Wellington, Wellington, New Zealand on 8 July 1866.

Brown's brother, Arthur Winton Brown was a mayor of Wellington.

References

1866 births
1947 deaths
New Zealand businesspeople
New Zealand philanthropists